Hi, Everything's Great. is the second album by Doghouse Records recording artist Limbeck. Limited Editions of the album came with the companion disc, Hey, Everything's Fine., which included the whole album done live, acoustic with many of their close friends. The vinyl edition of the record features two bonus tracks "Yeah Totally" and "The State".

Track listing
 "Honk + Wave"  – 3:28
 "Silver Things"  – 3:01
 "Julia"  – 2:48
 "This Place is Deserted"  – 2:56
 "I Wrote This Down"  – 3:18
 "The Sun Woke the Whole State"  – 3:39
 "Tan + Blue"  – 3:32
 "Gamblin' Man"  – 3:10
 "In Ohio on Some Steps"  – 3:33
 "Brand New Orange"  – 2:46
 "Albatross + Ivy"  – 2:01
 "Comin' From Tucson"  – 3:28

Personnel
 Robb MacLean - electric and lap steel guitars, vocals, banjo, percussion, photography
 Justin Entsminger - bass
 Matt Stephens - drums
 Patrick Carrie - electric and lap steel guitars, vocals, banjo

Additional musicians
 Rachael Cantu: Vocals
 Raquel Cantu: Vocals
 Chris Cron: Fender Rhodes, Hammond B3, Organ, Piano
 Ed Rose: Percussion

References

2003 albums
Albums produced by Ed Rose
Doghouse Records albums